

Wolfgang Böwing-Treuding (28 January 1922 – 11 February 1943) was a German Luftwaffe fighter pilot and recipient of the Knight's Cross of the Iron Cross during World War II.  Böwing-Treuding was credited by Nazi propaganda with 46 aerial victories, all over the Eastern Front. He was killed by the Red Army ground-fire on 11 February 1943 and was posthumously awarded the Knight's Cross on 24 March 1943.

Awards
 Ehrenpokal der Luftwaffe (13 September 1942)
 Front Flying Clasp of the Luftwaffe
 Iron Cross (1939)
 2nd Class
 1st Class
 German Cross in Gold on 15 October 1942 as Leutnant in the II./Jagdgeschwader 51
 Knight's Cross of the Iron Cross on 24 March 1943 as Oberleutnant and as  Staffelkapitän of the 10./Jagdgeschwader 51 "Mölders".

References

Citations

Bibliography

External links
TracesOfWar.com
Aces of the Luftwaffe

1922 births
1943 deaths
Luftwaffe pilots
German World War II flying aces
Recipients of the Gold German Cross
Recipients of the Knight's Cross of the Iron Cross
Luftwaffe personnel killed in World War II
Military personnel from Hamburg